William Harold Pickering (1 November 1901 – c. February 1971) was a British professional footballer. He initially played for Latch & Batchelors, before playing as an amateur for Sunderland. He went on to play for Merthyr Town, Gillingham, Huddersfield Town, Reading, Colwyn Bay United, Bristol Rovers, Accrington Stanley, Oswestry Town and Cradley Heath. He was born in Birmingham.

References

1901 births
1971 deaths
Footballers from Birmingham, West Midlands
English footballers
Sunderland A.F.C. players
Merthyr Town F.C. players
Gillingham F.C. players
Huddersfield Town A.F.C. players
Reading F.C. players
Colwyn Bay F.C. players
Bristol Rovers F.C. players
Accrington Stanley F.C. (1891) players
Oswestry Town F.C. players
Cradley Heath F.C. players
English Football League players
Association football fullbacks